The Scardiinae are a subfamily of moth of the family Tineidae.
Scardiinae are fungivorous and are characterised by larval features and lack of gnathos.

Genera
 Afroscardia
 Amorophaga
 Archyala Meyrick, 1889
 Bythocrates
 Cnismorectis
 Coniastis
 Cranaodes
 Daviscardia
 Diataga
 Dorata
 Hilaroptera 	Gozmány, 1969
 Leptozancla 	Meyrick, 1920
 Montescardia
 Morophaga Herrich-Schäffer, 1853
 Pelecystola 	Meyrick, 1920
 Scardia
 Scardiella
 Semeoloncha 	Gozmány, 1968
 Tinissa Walker, 1864
 Trigonarchis
 Vespitinea

References